Bernard Willem Holtrop (born 2 April 1941, Ermelo) is a Dutch cartoonist living in France since 1968, who publishes under the pen name Willem. He is renowned for his sometimes provocative cartoons featuring violent and sexual imagery on political topics. He is the winner of the 2000 Stripschapprijs. and of the 2013 Grand Prix de la ville d'Angoulême.

Willem has drawn in many newspapers: , Hara-Kiri, Charlie Hebdo, Charlie Mensuel, Libération, .

References

1941 births
Living people
Dutch editorial cartoonists
Dutch humorists
Dutch satirists
Dutch caricaturists
Dutch illustrators
Dutch comics artists
Dutch erotic artists
Cartoon controversies
People from Ermelo, Netherlands
Grand Prix de la ville d'Angoulême winners
Charlie Hebdo people
French male non-fiction writers
Winners of the Stripschapsprijs